The 1968 Taça de Portugal Final was the final match of the 1967–68 Taça de Portugal, the 28th season of the Taça de Portugal, the premier Portuguese football cup competition organized by the Portuguese Football Federation (FPF). The match was played on 16 June 1968 at the Estádio Nacional in Oeiras, and opposed two Primeira Liga sides: Porto and Vitória de Setúbal. Porto defeated Vitória de Setúbal 2–1 to claim a third Taça de Portugal.

Match

Details

References

1968
Taca
FC Porto matches
Vitória F.C. matches